Erich Hanisch (born 28 March 1909, date of death unknown) was a German sprint canoeist, born in Berlin, who competed in the 1936 Summer Olympics.

In 1936 he won the silver medal in the folding K-2 10000 metre competition with his partner Willi Horn.

References

External links
 
 
 

1909 births
Canoeists from Berlin
German male canoeists
Olympic canoeists of Germany
Canoeists at the 1936 Summer Olympics
Olympic silver medalists for Germany
Year of death missing
Olympic medalists in canoeing
Medalists at the 1936 Summer Olympics